Inner Circle Rum is a dark rum produced in Australia. The Inner Circle Rum brand name was sold to Vok Beverages, a subsidiary of Adelaide based beverage company Bickford's Australia. As of 2011 the brand is still owned by the 100% Australian owned company and is experiencing double digit growth.

See also

List of rum producers

References

External links
 
 

Rums
Australian rums
Distilleries in Australia
Companies established in 1884
Companies based in Queensland